Dragutin Spasojević (February 15, 1934 – May 21, 2016) was a Montenegrin football player and manager.

He managed  NK Rijeka, OFK Bor, NK Čelik Zenica, FK Rad, FK Sutjeska Nikšić, FK Trepča, FK Borac Čačak, FK Budućnost Titograd, OFK Beograd, FK Spartak Subotica, FK Čukarički, NK GOŠK Jug and FK Sloga Kraljevo. He was also president of the board for FSSCG and FSCG.

He is most famous for winning the 1978 Yugoslav Cup with NK Rijeka.

Managerial career
Spasojević began his coaching career in Prizren, 1962 where he formed a football school for youth players. 

With Sloga he won Yugoslav Second League in 1970, but failed to qualify for First League losing to Crvenka. He began coaching Sutjeska Nikšić a year later and won the Second League and gained promotion. He also managed OFK Bor two times in 1972–73 and 1974–1976. 

Spasojević became manager of NK Rijeka in April 1976 replacing Gojko Zec. He stayed with club for two years accumulating over 100 matches. In 1978 he led the club to the Yugoslav Cup final where Rijeka beat his former club Trepča. The same year he also won the Balkans Cup. He became a club legend after winning the clubs first trophies.

Personal life
He was married to Leposava and father of Krsto, Ilija and Mirko. Spasojević was a big supporter of Sutjeska

Managerial statistics

 *Dates of first and last games under Spasojević; not dates of official appointments

Honours

FK Sloga Kraljevo
Yugoslav Second League East: 1969–70

Sutjeska Nikšić
Yugoslav Second League South: 1970–71

NK Rijeka
Yugoslav Cup: 1978
Balkans Cup: 1978

FK Borac Čačak
Second League of Serbia and Montenegro: 1993–94

References

External links
Prishtina
Yuliga2

1934 births
2016 deaths
Footballers from Nikšić
Footballers from Rijeka
Association football defenders
Yugoslav footballers
FC Prishtina players
Yugoslav football managers
FC Prishtina managers
FK Sutjeska Nikšić managers
FK Bor managers
HNK Rijeka managers
NK Čelik Zenica managers
FK Rad managers
FK Borac Čačak managers
FK Budućnost Podgorica managers
OFK Beograd managers
FK Spartak Subotica managers
FK Čukarički managers